James Walter Elder (October 5, 1882 – December 16, 1941) was a one-term United States Representative for Louisiana's 5th congressional district. A native of Grand Prairie, Texas, he attended the public schools and from 1895 to 1901 Baylor University in Waco, Texas. He later studied law, was admitted to the bar in 1903, and commenced practice in Farmerville in Union Parish, Louisiana.

Elder served as mayor of Farmerville before he moved to Monroe in Ouachita Parish to continue his legal practice. He was a member of the Louisiana State Senate for one term from 1908 to 1912 and was elected as a Democrat to the Sixty-third Congress, in which he served from March 4, 1913, to  March 3, 1915. He was defeated for renomination in 1914 by Riley J. Wilson.

After leaving Congress, Elder returned to the practice of law in Farmerville. On January 1, 1925, he relocated to Ruston, where he continued the practice of law until his death. He is interred at Greenwood Cemetery in Ruston.

References

1882 births
1941 deaths
Democratic Party Louisiana state senators
People from Grand Prairie, Texas
Politicians from Monroe, Louisiana
Politicians from Ruston, Louisiana
Louisiana lawyers
Democratic Party members of the United States House of Representatives from Louisiana
Mayors of places in Louisiana
20th-century American politicians
People from Farmerville, Louisiana
Burials in Louisiana
20th-century American lawyers